Two ships of the British  Royal Navy have been called HMS Ithuriel after an angel in John Milton's epic poem Paradise Lost:

 The first, was a  flotilla leader originally named Gabriel but renamed before her launching in 1916.  After serving through the First World War she was broken up in 1921.
 The second, was a destroyer built for the Turkish Navy as Gayret but taken over by the Royal Navy on the outbreak of the Second World War whilst still under construction. She was sunk in 1942 but salvaged at the end of the war to be scrapped.

References

Ithuriel